The Shoji Ueda Museum of Photography, is a museum in Hōki, Tottori, Japan that is solely dedicated to exhibiting and archiving the work of the photographer Shoji Ueda.

The museum was founded in 1995. The collection consists of over 12,000 works by Shoji Ueda. The building was designed by Shin Takamatsu. The architectural relationships between volumetric solids and voids (as scaled incisions in the volume) function to frame Mount Daisen.

Gallery

See also
 List of museums devoted to one photographer

References

Further reading
Cerver, Francisco Asenio. Shoji Ueda Museum of Photography in The Architecture of Museums, pgs. 162-170, University of Michigan Press, 1997.

External links
 Official website
 Photographs of the museum

Museums in Tottori Prefecture
Cultural organizations based in Japan
20th-century Japanese photographers
Museums of Japanese art
Art museums established in 1995
Photography museums and galleries in Japan
1995 establishments in Japan
Museums devoted to one artist